RCPD may refer to:

Redwood City Police Department, Redwood City, California
Rockville City Police Department, Rockville, Maryland